Nathan Wilson (December 23, 1758 – July 25, 1834) was a United States representative from New York. Born in Bolton, Worcester County, Massachusetts, he moved with his family to Greenwich, Hampshire County, Massachusetts, where he attended school. He served two enlistments in Massachusetts regiments during the Revolutionary War in 1777 and 1780 and moved to New Perth (now Salem), Washington County, New York. He enlisted as a private in the Sixteenth Regiment, Albany County Militia and was appointed by Governor George Clinton in 1791 adjutant in Washington County Militia Regiment. He was town collector in 1801 and 1802 and sheriff of Washington County from 1802 to 1806.

Wilson was elected as a Democratic-Republican to the Tenth Congress to fill the vacancy caused by the resignation of David Thomas and served from November 7, 1808, to March 4, 1809. He was justice of the peace from 1808 to 1816 and engaged in agricultural pursuits. He died near Salem in 1834; interment was in Evergreen Cemetery, Salem.

References

1758 births
1834 deaths
People from Salem, New York
New York (state) sheriffs
New York (state) state court judges
People from Bolton, Massachusetts
People from Greenwich, Massachusetts
Democratic-Republican Party members of the United States House of Representatives from New York (state)